John Hartwell Marable (November 18, 1786 – April 11, 1844) was an American politician who represented Tennessee in the United States House of Representatives.

Biography
Marable was born near Lawrenceville, Virginia, on November 18, 1786. He pursued an academic course and studied in Philadelphia, Pennsylvania. According to compiled records, he attended the University of Pennsylvania School of Medicine in 1805 and 1806. He married Ann Jones "Nancy" Watson on July 17, 1808 in Davidson County, Tennessee.

Career
Marable practiced medicine and moved to Yellow Creek, Tennessee, where he continued to engage in the practice, and served as Postmaster, Yellow Creek, Montgomery County, Tennessee. He owned slaves. He was a member of the Tennessee Senate in 1817 and 1818. He elected alderman for the city of Clarksville, Tennessee in 1819, and was a Charter Member of the  Medical Association in Tennessee.

Marable was elected as a Jacksonian Republican to the Nineteenth and Twentieth Congresses, serving from March 4, 1825 to March 3, 1829.  He was an unsuccessful candidate for re-election to the Twenty-first Congress, and resumed his  practice.

Death
Marable died in Montgomery County, Tennessee on April 11, 1844 (age 57 years, 145 days). He is interred at Marable Cemetery near Clarksville, Tennessee.

References

External links
 
John Hartwell Marable's entry at the  Biographical Directory of the United States Congress.
The University of Pennsylvania School of Medicine's list of alumni, faculty, and trustees in Congress.
Marable Family
 http://image2.findagrave.com/photos250/photos/2005/339/6912792_113388496965.jpg

1786 births
1844 deaths
People from Brunswick County, Virginia
American people of English descent
Jacksonian members of the United States House of Representatives from Tennessee
Tennessee state senators
Physicians from Tennessee
American slave owners
Perelman School of Medicine at the University of Pennsylvania alumni